Martin Kersels (born 1960) is an American contemporary artist. Kersels' work is largely installation based, incorporating sculpture, photography and video. Kersels is a professor of sculpture and director of graduate studies at the Yale School of Art.

Exhibitions
2010
"2010: Whitney Biennial", The Whitney Museum of American Art, New York, USA

2009
Fat Iggy: Discography, Galerie Georges-Philippe & Nathalie Vallois, Paris, France
"Fat Iggy", Guido Costa Projects, Torino, Italy
"California Video", The J. Paul Getty Museum, Los Angeles, USA

2008
"Headache and Other New Works", ACME., Los Angeles, USA
Heavyweight Champion, Santa Monica Museum of Art, USA

2007
Heavyweight Champion, The Frances Young Tang Teaching Museum, Saratoga, USA

2006
Tumble Room/Deitch Projects, Art Unlimited, Art 37 Basel, Basel, Switzerland
Charms in a Throne Room, ACME., Los Angeles, USA

2005
Orchestra for Idiots, Galerie Georges-Philippe & Nathalie Vallois, Paris, France

2004
Wishing Well, ACME, Los Angeles, US.
Illuminous, Guido Costa Project, Turin, Italy.

2002
Fat Man, Galerie Georges-Philippe & Nathalie Vallois, Paris, France
Bracelet, Peggy Phelps Gallery, Claremont Graduate University, USA
Martin Kersels, Showette / John Sonsini Recent Paintings, ACME Gallery, Los Angeles, USA

2001
Tumble Room Deitch Projects, New York.

Collections 

 Centre Georges Pompidou, Paris, France
 Museum of Modern Art, New York
 Santa Monica Museum of Art, Santa Monica
 Orange County Museum of Art, Newport Beach
 Hammer Museum, Los Angeles
 Museum of Contemporary Art, Los Angeles, Los Angeles
 Los Angeles County Museum of Art, Los Angeles
 Museum of Contemporary Art, North Miami
 Fonds national d'art contemporain, Paris, France
 Centre national des arts plastiques, Paris, France
 Whitney Museum of American Art, New York
 Madison Museum of Contemporary Art, Madison, WI
 The Francis Tang Teaching Museum, Saratoga, NY
 Schwartz Art Collection, Harvard Business School, Cambridge, MA
 Henry Art Gallery, Seattle, Washington

Awards
Kersels was a 2008 Guggenheim Fellow.

Academic career
In 1999 Kersels and author/artist Leslie Dick were jointly selected "to run the arts program" at CalArts at the California Institute of the Arts (CalArts). Kersels served as co-director of the CalArts Program in Art until he moved to the Yale School of Art, where in 2012 he became an associate professor and director of graduate studies in sculpture.

References

External links
 Martin Kersels at Yale School of Art
 Mousse Magazine

American contemporary artists
Living people
1960 births
Performance art in Los Angeles
Artists from Los Angeles
California Institute of the Arts faculty
Yale University faculty